Cornelius George Hogan (18 August 1881 – 22 November 1939) was an Australian rules footballer who played for the South Melbourne Football Club in the Victorian Football League (VFL).

References

External links 

1881 births
1939 deaths
Australian rules footballers from Victoria (Australia)
Sydney Swans players